Blepephaeus infelix is a species of beetle in the family Cerambycidae. It was described by Francis Polkinghorne Pascoe in 1856. It is known from China and North Korea.

References

Blepephaeus
Beetles described in 1856